The Central District of Sib and Suran County is a district (bakhsh) in Sib and Suran County, Sistan and Baluchestan province, Iran. At the 2006 census, its population was 44,041, in 9,033 families.  The district has one city: Suran. The district has two rural districts (dehestan): Paskuh Rural District and Sib and Suran Rural District.

References 

Sib and Suran County
Districts of Sistan and Baluchestan Province